Attiya Dawood (Urdu: عطیہ داؤد born April 1, 1958) is a Sindhi poet, writer, feminist and activist. She was born in Moledino Larik (a small village in Naushero Feroze, Sindh, Pakistan)  She has been hailed as one of the most important feminist Sindhi writers of her time. Attiya uses her poetry to highlight the oppression of women in Sindhi society in the name of tradition. She has been writing poetry since 1980.

Personal life

Early life 
Attiya Dawood was born in Moledino Larik; a village in Naushero Feroze. Attiya was born to her father; Muhammad Dawood's third wife Arbab Khatoon. Attiya's father, Muhammad Dawood Larik was a Hafiz and a poet who ran away from home to become a school teacher. He died at the age of 60 in 1965 when Attiya was 6 years old. During the 1970s, Attiya's family moved to Karachi where she took admission in a college. During this time, she struggled a lot, socially and financially and had to work in a towel factory to bear the expenses. She started writing poetry when she was introduced to Ahmed Saleem by her friend Rupa. From there, she became a member of Sindhi Adabi Sangat. Since the 1980s she has been writing poetry regularly.

Attiya published her first poem when she was in 8th grade. Attiya Dawood, originally Attiya Larik, changed her name to Dawood in the early 70's when she published her first poem in a Sindhi-language newspaper. Attiya had received a negative feedback from her family, particularly her brothers over publishing a poem. In retaliation, She decided to change the title Larik, as it was her brother's name and decided to switch to Dawood, which was her father's name.

Education 
Attiya holds an M.A in Sindhi Literature.

Marriage 
Attiya Dawood is married to Khuda Baksh Abro, a well known artist and designer who graduated from National College of Arts, Lahore. She has two daughters with him.

Career 
Attiya began her career as a writer and poet in the 1980s. She has been a regular contributor to Hilal e Pakistan and its women pages Sartiyun. She has also contributed to workshops and seminars by writing papers on subjects such as folk artists and men of letters in Sindhi language. She has published six books, and her articles on women's rights, peace, justice, and gender issues have appeared in major national dailies and literary journals. She has also been comparing in radio programs on women and their problems. She also served in a government department

Poet 
Attiya's poetry career began in the 1980s, when she started contributing to a local magazine. In 1995, Attiya published her first collection of poetry titled "Raging to be free", which were English translations of her works in Sindhi. Since, then she has written a small volume of poetry that is acknowledged by many writers and poets. Amrita Pritam, an Indian novelist had said of her “Attiya is a real poet. I would like to write her in Hindi and Punjabi.”

Activist 
Attiya Dawood is known for her bold stance on women's rights. She is known as a feminist writer and poet. Her poetry and writings challenge the society and contains verses that support her opinions on women and their rights. In a literary sitting in Larkana, Attiya said: “I am proud to be a feminist poet but I am afraid male-dominated society interprets it wrongly.” She mentioned that male critics often found negativity in her work but the criticism will not stop her from her objectives.

Attiya  participated in the NGO segment of a Conference in Beijing, as one of the representatives of ASR Resource Centre, a Lahore-based NGO. The NGOs consisted of 130 workshops, each one on a separate topic.

Selected works 
Attiya Dawood has numerous publications to her credit. She writes mostly in Sindhi. She draws inspiration from her traumatic girlhood experiences in rural Sindh. Her poems have been translated into German by Annemarrie Schimmel who is known for her works in Sufism and Islam. Her works have also been translated in English and Urdu. Two of her poems have appeared in Jane Goodwin's "The Price of Honor". Attiya's poetry is noted for its sincerity, zeal and the feminism touch it contains. Through her poetry and writings, she speaks about Women's rights.

Raging to be free; a poetry collection and Sindh ki Aurat are books that talk about the hurdles of women through Attiya's experiences. Professor Tanveer Junejo said about the Sindh Ki Aurat: " Atiya had studied the miseries of women very closely, which was mirrored in her writings. She said that a rural woman had to suffer more than an urban woman."

Ainay Kay Saamnay is an Urdu autobiography of Attiya Dawood. It was earlier published in Hindi in India by the same title by Rajkamal Prakashan, as Attiya wrote the story of her life during a residency at the Sanskriti Kendra in New Delhi. In Ainay kay Saamnay, Attiya narrates her personal experiences and her early life in the rural Sindh, her frustrations over the patriarchal society and culture as a young girl.

Sindhi Adab, is a book about the history of Sindhi literature. It provides an overview of the literary expression in Sindhi literature over the many centuries. It covers the Soomra period literature and its poets such as Jam Lakho and Mehar Rai.

Selected awards

References

1958 births
Living people
Pakistani expatriates in India
Pakistani activists
Pakistani women activists
Pakistani feminist writers
Pakistani women poets
Sindhi female writers
Writers from Sindh
Sindhi-language poets
Sindhi-language writers
Sindhi literature
Feminism in Pakistan
Pakistani women
Women in Pakistan
Sindhi people
Pakistani writers